Jacob Joseph Frank (born Jakub Lejbowicz; 1726 – 10 December 1791) was a Polish-Jewish religious leader who claimed to be the reincarnation of the self-proclaimed messiah Sabbatai Zevi (1626–1676) and also of the biblical patriarch Jacob. The Jewish authorities in Poland excommunicated Frank and his followers due to his heretical doctrines that included deification of himself as a part of a trinity and other controversial concepts such as neo-Carpocratian "purification through transgression".

Frank arguably created a new denomination of Judaism, now referred to as Frankism, which incorporated some aspects of Christianity into Judaism. The development of Frankism was one of the consequences of the messianic movement of Sabbatai Zevi. This religious mysticism followed socioeconomic changes among the Jews of Poland, Lithuania and Ruthenia.

Historical background
There were numerous Jewish secret societies of Sabbateans (followers of Sabbatai Zevi), known as Dönmeh, in Eastern Poland (now Ukraine), particularly in Podolia and Galicia, at the end of the seventeenth century.

In expectation of the great Messianic revolution, the members of these societies violated Jewish laws and customs. The mystical cult of the Sabbateans is believed to have included both asceticism and sensuality: some did penance for their sins, subjected themselves to self-inflicted pain, and "mourned for Zion"; others disregarded the strict rules of modesty required by Judaism, and at times were accused of being licentious. The Polish rabbis attempted to ban the "Sabbatean heresy" at the assembly at Lwów (now Lviv in Ukraine) in 1722. Still, they could not fully succeed, as it was widely popular among the nascent Jewish middle class.

Early life
Jacob Frank is believed to have been born as Jakub Lejbowicz to a Polish-Jewish family in Korołówka, in Podolia of Eastern Poland (now in Ukraine), in about 1726. The Polish historian Gaudenty Pikulski affirmed that Frank was born in Buchach and Agnon even showed the house where he was born was located on Korołówka street in Buchach. His father was a Sabbatean, and moved to Czernowitz, in the Carpathian region of Bukovina, in 1730, where the Sabbatean influence at the time was strong.

As a travelling merchant in textile and precious stones he often visited Ottoman territories, where he earned the nickname "Frank", a name generally given in the East to Europeans, and lived in the centers of contemporary Sabbateanism, Salonica and Smyrna.

In the early 1750s, Frank became intimate with the leaders of the Sabbateans. Two followers of the Sabbatian leader Osman Baba (b. 1720) were witnesses at his wedding in 1752. In 1755, he reappeared in Podolia, gathered a group of local adherents, and began to preach the "revelations" which were communicated to him by the Dönmeh in Salonica. One of these gatherings in Landskron ended in a scandal, and the rabbis' attention was drawn to the new teachings. Frank was forced to leave Podolia, while his followers were hounded and denounced to the local authorities by the rabbis (1756). At the rabbinical court held in the village of Satanów (today Sataniv in Ukraine) the Sabbateans were accused of having broken fundamental Jewish laws of morality and modesty.

The anti-Talmudists

Consequent to these disclosures the congress of rabbis in Brody proclaimed a universal herem (excommunication) against all "impenitent heretics", and made it obligatory upon every pious Jew to seek them out and expose them. The Sabbateans informed Mikołaj Dembowski, the Catholic Bishop of Kamieniec Podolski, Poland, that they rejected the Talmud and recognized only the sacred book of Kabbalah, the Zohar, which did not contradict the Christian doctrine of the Trinity. They stated that they regarded the Messiah-Deliverer as one of the embodiments of the three divinities.

The bishop took Frank and his followers (the "Anti-Talmudists", or "Zoharistic Jews") under his protection and in 1757 arranged a religious disputation between them and the rabbis of the traditionalist community. The Anti-Talmudists presented their theses, which began the intense dispute. The bishop sided in favour of the Frankists and also ordered the burning of all copies of the Talmud in Poland. 10,000 volumes were destroyed, which was a tremendous loss for the Jewish libraries of that era.

After the death of the bishop, the Sabbateans were subjected to severe persecution by the rabbis, although they succeeded in obtaining an edict from Augustus III of Poland guaranteeing them safety.

Declaration of being a successor to Sabbatai Zevi

At this critical moment Jacob Frank came to Iwania, proclaimed himself as a direct successor to Sabbatai Zevi and Osman Baba, and assured his adherents that he had received revelations from Heaven. These revelations called for the conversion of Frank and his followers to the Christian religion, which was to be a visible transition stage to the future "das" or religion to be revealed by Frank. In 1759 negotiations looking toward the conversion of the Frankists to Roman Catholicism were being actively carried on with the higher representatives of the Polish Church; at the same time the Frankists tried to secure another discussion with the rabbis. The Polish primate Łubieński and the papal nuncio Nicholas Serra were suspicious of the aspirations of the Frankists, but at the insistence of the administrator of the bishopric of Lwów, the canon Mikulski, the discussion was arranged. It was held in Lwów and was presided over by Mikulski. Protestant missionaries also tried to detour the Frankists to Protestantism, and a handful did join the Moravian church.

Baptism of the Frankists
At the discussion in 1759, the rabbis energetically repulsed their opponents. After the discussion the Frankists were requested to demonstrate in practice their adherence to Christianity; Jacob Frank, who had then arrived in Lwów, encouraged his followers to take the decisive step. The baptism of the Frankists was celebrated with great solemnity in the churches of Lwów, with members of the Polish szlachta (nobility) acting as god-parents. The neophytes adopted the names of their godfathers and godmothers, and ultimately joined their ranks. Frank himself was baptized in Lwów (17 September 1759) and again in Warsaw the next day, with King Augustus III as his godfather. Frank's baptismal name was "Joseph" (Józef). In the course of one year more than 500 individuals were converted to Christianity at Lwów, and nearly a thousand in the following year. By 1790, 26,000 Jews were recorded baptised in Poland.

However, the Frankists continued to be viewed with suspicion due to their strange doctrines. Frank was arrested in Warsaw on 6 February 1760 and delivered to the Church's tribunal on the charge of heresy. He was convicted of teaching heresy, and imprisoned in the monastery of Częstochowa.

Prison and later days

Frank's imprisonment lasted thirteen years, yet it only increased his influence with the sect by surrounding him with the aura of martyrdom. Many Frankists established themselves near Częstochowa, and kept up constant communication with their "holy master". Frank inspired his followers through mystical speeches and epistles, in which he stated that salvation could be gained only by first adopting the "religion of Edom" and later adopting a future religion which Frank called daas (daat, or Knowledge in Hebrew). After the first partition of Poland, Frank was released by the Russian general Bibikov, who had occupied Częstochowa, in August 1772.

Frank lived in the Moravian town of Brno until 1786, surrounded by a retinue of adherents and pilgrims who came from Poland. His daughter Eve began to play an important role in the sect at this time. Frank kept a force of armed men at his "court". The future czar Paul I of Russia visited him together with Joseph II of Austria.

Accompanied by his daughter, Frank repeatedly traveled to Vienna, and succeeded in gaining the favor of the court. Maria Theresa regarded him as a disseminator of Christianity among the Jews, and it is even said that Joseph II was favorably inclined to the young Eve Frank. Ultimately Frank was deemed unmanageable and he was obliged to leave Austria. He moved with his daughter and his retinue to Offenbach, in Germany, where he assumed the title of "Baron of Offenbach," and lived as a wealthy nobleman, receiving financial support from his Polish and Moravian followers, who made frequent pilgrimages to Offenbach. On the death of Frank in 1791, Eve became the "holy mistress" and leader of the sect. Her fortunes dwindled in the aftermath of the Napoleonic Wars, and she died in Offenbach in 1816.

Some Frankists were active during the French Revolution, such as Moses Dobruška, a son of Frank's Sabbatian cousin in Offenbach Shendl Dobruska. Many of the Frankists saw Napoleon Bonaparte as a potential Messiah. The Frankists scattered in Poland and Bohemia eventually intermarried into the gentry and middle class. Maria Szymanowska, a piano virtuoso, came from a Frankist family. Wanda Grabowska, the mother of Tadeusz Boy-Żeleński, also descended from Frankists.

In 1883, a Russian magazine Русская старина (Russian Old Times) issued memoirs of an influential official of the Russian Ministry of the Interior, the privy councillor and staunch anti-Semite O. A. Pzhetslavsky. He promulgated the allegations that the mothers of "three of the greatest men of Poland" (Frédéric Chopin, Adam Mickiewicz and Juliusz Słowacki) were converted Jews from the Frankist sect. Similar assertions were put forth by Mieses and Balaban.

Notable Sabbatian teachers of Jakob Frank
 Rabbi Issohar, one of Frank's principal teachers. A disciple of Hayim Malakh, Frank studied with him in Izmir in 1750–52.
 Rabbi Mordechai ben Elias Margalit of Prague (Mardocheusz in Polish), another of Frank's principal teachers. He helped introduce Frank to the practices of the Karakashi sect of the Dönmeh in the Turkish empire, which worshipped Beruchiah Russo (also known as Otman Baba). Frank traveled with him to Salonika in November 1753. He left Bohemia and moved to the Ottoman Empire after Jakob Frank's uncle Moses Meir Kamenker was caught smuggling Sabbatian literature into Germany in 1725. Mordechai allegedly engaged in adultery and other antinomian conduct.
 Leib, a Jewish Sabbatian teacher of Frank's during the latter's childhood in Wallachia and Moldavia. He was also a wonderworker who attempted to dispel demons.

Jacob Frank's writings
The Collection of the Words of the Lord, available online in English.  Translated, edited and annotated by Harris Lenowitz, with an introduction by Lenowitz.

Cultural references
 Jacob Frank is the subject of Andrzej Żuławski's book Moliwda (1994).
 The personality of Frank has inspired the Polish historical movie Daas of 2011 directed by Adrian Panek. Frank is played by Olgierd Łukaszewicz.
 Jacob Frank is the central character in the novel by Polish Nobel laureate writer Olga Tokarczuk The Books of Jacob published in October 2014 by Wydawnictwo Literackie.

See also
 Apostasy in Judaism
 Christianity and Judaism
 Criticism of the Talmud
 Harris Lenowitz, a professor at the University of Utah who has extensively studied Frank's writings
 List of messiah claimants
 Messiah complex
 Schisms among the Jews

References

Bibliography
 
 
 Lenowitz, Harris,  “The Charlatan at the Gottes Haus in Offenbach,” in Goldish, Matt, and Richard H. Popkin, eds., Jewish Messianism in the Early Modern World, Dordrecth, Kluwer Academic, 2001, pp. 189–202.
 
 
 
 Maciejko, Pawel (2005). "'Baruch Yavan and the Frankist movement : intercession in an age of upheaval", Jahrbuch des Simon-Dubnow-Instituts 4 (2005) pp. 333–354.
 Maciejko, Pawel (2006). "'Christian elements in early Frankist doctrine", Gal-Ed 20 (2006) pp. 13–41.
 
 
 

1726 births
1791 deaths
18th-century Christians
18th-century Polish rabbis
Converts to Roman Catholicism from Judaism
 
Jacob
Jews from Galicia (Eastern Europe)
Jewish messiah claimants
Kabbalists
People from Ternopil Oblast
Polish Ashkenazi Jews
Polish Roman Catholics
Sabbateans
Founders of religions